Mary's Ankle is a 1920 American silent comedy film directed by Lloyd Ingraham and written by Luther Reed based upon the play of the same name by May Tully. The film stars Douglas MacLean, Doris May, Victor Potel, Neal Burns, James Gordon, and Lizette Thorne. The film was released on February 29, 1920, by Paramount Pictures.

Plot
As described in a film magazine, Dr. Arthur P. Hampton (MacLean), a struggling young physician, announces his marriage to a fictitious "Mary Jane Smith" in an effort to get his wealthy uncle George P. Hampton (Gordon) to give him and his two friends, a lawyer and a broker, sufficient funds to get them out of financial difficulties. He then finds himself in a difficult position when an injured young woman is brought to his office for treatment proves to be Mary Jane Smith (May) and his uncle appears to meet the bride. Mary consents to a temporary deception. Matters become complicated when the uncle insists on their accompanying him on a trip to Hawaii and informs them that he is to marry a Miss Burns (Thorne), who is Mary's aunt. The troubles of Arthur and Mary become acute on the ship. Finally, an explanation results in forgiveness, and they make the trip a honeymoon by having the ship's captain marry them.

Cast
Douglas MacLean as Dr. Arthur P. Hampton
Doris May as Mary Jane Smith
Victor Potel as Johnny Stokes
Neal Burns as Stub Masters
James Gordon as George P. Hampton
Lizette Thorne as Angelica Burns
Ida Lewis as Mrs. Merrivale (*Ida Lewis 1855–1935; not Julia Arthur)

Preservation status
A copy of the film is in the Library of Congress.

References

External links 

 
 Film still at silenthollywood.com

1920 films
1920s English-language films
Silent American comedy films
1920 comedy films
Paramount Pictures films
Films directed by Lloyd Ingraham
American black-and-white films
American silent feature films
1920s American films